Thika is an industrial town and a major commerce hub in Kiambu County, Kenya, lying on the A2 road , Northeast of Nairobi, near the confluence of the Thika and Chania Rivers. Although Thika town is administratively in Kiambu County, the greater Thika area comprising such residential areas such as Bendor estate, Maporomoko, Thika Greens, Thika Golden Pearl, Bahati Ridge, Thika Sports Club, among others, are within Murang'a County. Thika has a population of 279,429 (as of the 2019 National Census) which is growing rapidly, as is the entire greater Nairobi area.

Thika is home to the Chania Falls, Fourteen Falls on the Athi River and the Thika Falls. Ol Donyo Sabuk National Park lies to the southeast. The town has a railway station with limited passenger service as only cargo trains operate, although there are plans to extend the proposed light rail system to Thika.

The town was the headquarters of Thika West district following the split of the larger Thika district (created in 1994) into five districts: Thika East and Thika West, Ruiru, Gatundu and Gatanga. It was the seat of the South Central regional commissioner (deputy Provincial Commissioner) for Central Province appointed by then president Mwai Kibaki in 2009 who was in charge of the larger Kiambu, Thika and Murang'a districts. However, under Kenya's new constitution, which recognizes only the 47 districts in existence before 1992 as semi-autonomous counties, Thika town falls under Kiambu County while some residential areas of Thika are in Murang'a county. Although Kiambu Town is expected to be the new county headquarters, Thika Town remains as the main commercial centre as well as the seat of the Thika Sub-county of the Kiambu County.

The Flame Trees of Thika (Memories of an African Childhood) is a book by Elspeth Huxley, later adapted for television by Euston Films for Thames Television. It describes the life of English and Scottish settlers in the "White Highlands" during Edwardian times.

History
There are two explanations for the origin of the name Thika. One has it coming from the Kikuyu word Guthika, meaning "to bury". During a great drought, the Maasai people ventured outside of their normal territories looking for water for their huge herds of cattle. Two rivers pass through Kikuyu land, the Thika and the Chania, providing sustenance for the agricultural Kikuyu. With both tribes desperate for survival, they fought a bloody battle that left few survivors. A mound near Blue Posts Hotel supposedly marks where the slain warriors were buried. Thika was also used as a memorial burial site for soldiers who fought in World War II.

The other theory claims it was derived from the Maasai word Sika meaning "rubbing something off an edge".

In addition, the area was inhabited by the Akamba tribe and hence was a border region between three communities.

Towards the end of the 19th century, Europeans and Asians settled Thika, establishing schools, farms, health-care and businesses in the region. A monument in the shape of a pillar was erected by the British in the early 1900s in the central business district of Thika, commemorating the founding of Thika as a town. The town was given its status by the government gazette in 1924. Thereafter it was elevated to a municipality when Kenya gained independence in 1963, and the first mayor was chosen in 1968.

The town has historical sites like the Mugumo Gardens, which is named for the giant fig tree where the ancient legendary seer Mugo wa Kibiro prophesied. Believers claim that all of his prophesies have come to pass. According to legend, the fall of the tree would symbolise the fall of British rule in Kenya. The British government reinforced the tree to prevent it from falling but it split into two parts and fell in two stages in 1963. This land is said to have belonged to the first president, Mzee Jomo Kenyatta.

Media Stations
Thika Town is home to a number of media houses, including radio and TV stations. There are also several print media houses.

Chania FM, Kenya
Chania FM, Kenya is a media outlet under the parent company, Chania Media Prospects. Founded in 2019, it is part of several other media outlets managed by the parent company and focuses on the larger Kiambu County and other neighboring counties. It becomes the first in Kenya to be a dedicated country music station.

Economic activities
Thika is externally serviced by an eight-lane superhighway, a highway to Garissa and the rest of north-east Kenya, a highway to the central highlands and a railway line (with plans to add a passenger light rail to Nairobi). Internally, the town has a well maintained road network.

The main economic activities include agricultural processing, particularly in horticulture and pineapple (exported mainly to Europe), coffee (exports mainly to the United States and Europe), cooking oils (to the rest of Kenya and eastern Africa) and animal feed processing. Other industries include textile (cotton), macadamia nuts, wheat, tannery, motor vehicle assemblies, cigarette manufacturing, bakeries, packaging and industrial chemicals. About 100 small-scale industries and about 20 major factories exist in and around the town. The service sector is well represented with the establishment and growth of a number of educational and financial institutions. Thika is home or close to three universities, tens of middle-level colleges, hundreds of secondary and primary schools and dozens of financial institutions.

Thika has a bustling nightlife with clubs like Blend and The Garage Bar & Grill, modern recreation centres and significant retail trading operations. The growth of the greater Nairobi region and improved infrastructure and services has led to new residential estates.

Bidco Oil Refineries

Bidco oil Refineries, headquartered in Thika, is East Africa's leading edible oil, soaps and detergents, margarine and baking powder marketer with more than 30 brands. A number of brands have majority market share in their domain. Some of their brands that are household names include (Edible Oils) Elianto, Sun Gold, Soya Gold, Olive Gold and Golden Fry; In the fats section Kimbo and Cowboy, Chipsy; in the Laundry Segment are Power Boy Pro Activ Liquid and Powder detergent, Gental, the Star Series soaps; The personal care segment include Pure n Natural Woman and Man; Margarines are Gold Band and Biddy's and Mariandazi baking powder. The plant at Thika employs more than 2000 people.

Del-Monte Pineapples
Del Monte is one of the world's producers, marketers and distributors of fresh and fresh-cut fruit and vegetables, as well as a leading producer and distributor of prepared fruit and vegetables, juices, beverages, snacks and desserts in Europe, the Middle East and Africa.

Geography
The town is located on a gentle plain before the ascent into the central highlands. Small valleys are on the western and northern edges following the Chania and Thika Rivers that have waterfalls and meet on the northwestern edge of Thika. Thika Town is also home to Kenya's magical and breathtaking Fourteen Falls which is located 65 kilometres northeast of Nairobi off the Thika-Garissa Road. The Fourteen Falls consist of 14 distinct waterfalls on the broad section of the famous Athi River.

Climate
Thika has a subtropical highland climate (Köppen: Cwb) with sunshine most of the year and an average annual temperature of 19.8 °C, with the hottest period in March and April leading to the long rains and the coldest in July. The "long rains" season lasts from March/April to May/June. The "short rains" season is from October to November/December.

Local government
Before the 2010 constitution, the local government consisted of a thirteen-member Municipal Council, with responsibilities for governmental functions delegated to appointed committees. The mayor was chosen from among the elected or nominated councillors for one-year terms. However, with the new constitution, the municipality was abolished. The town is now under the governance of Kiambu County.

The town in 2008 signed a sister city agreement with Dixon, Illinois to create new economic, cultural and social opportunities.

Education

Universities and major colleges
Kenya School of Medical Science and Technology - Main Campus - Memorial Hospital
Experts Business College
Amboseli Institute
Cascade Institute of Hospitality
Chania Boys High School
Excel Institute of Professionals
Gretsa University
Havard Institute of Development Studies
International Centre of Technology
Kenya Institute of Management
Mount Kenya University
Reward Institute of Professional Studies
Success Professionals Institute
Thika College of Banking
Thika Institute of Science and Technology
Thika Technical Institute
Kenya School of Medical Science and Technology - Town Campus - 4th Floor above Tuskys Chap Chap
Thika High School
Jodan College Of Technology
Thika School of Medical and Health Sciences
Thika Institute of Business Studies
MIPS Technical College

Other schools
Joytown Primary School

Notable people 
 

Catherine Kiguru (born 1987), computer scientist, entrepreneur and corporate executive

See also 
Thika Road
Transport in Kenya

Notes

Sources 
 knbs.or.ke

External links 

 chaniafm.co.ke

 
Kiambu County
Populated places in Central Province (Kenya)